Durgapur Thermal Power Station is located near Waria Railway Station, 6 km from Durgapur railway station in West Bengal. The power plant is one of the coal based power plants of DVC.

Power plant
DTPS was set up in the sixties of last century with two 75 MW units and one 140 MW unit in the first stage. Another 210 MW unit was added to the plant in the early eighties to augment supplies to the growing industrial demand. The first 2 units of the Station had to be de-commissioned after a fire accident in 1985.

Installed capacity

U#3 has ABL make boilers and GE make turbine-generators, while U#4 has boiler, turbine and generator are of BHEL make.

See also 

 Chandrapura Thermal Power Station
 Bokaro Thermal Power Station B
 Mejia Thermal Power Station

References 

Coal-fired power stations in West Bengal
Buildings and structures in Durgapur, West Bengal
Energy infrastructure completed in 1966
1966 establishments in West Bengal
20th-century architecture in India